Ultima II Massage is the third studio album by Black Moth Super Rainbow frontman Tobacco. It was released through Ghostly International on May 13, 2014.

Critical reception

At Metacritic, which assigns a weighted average score out of 100 to reviews from mainstream critics, Ultima II Massage received an average score of 73% based on 13 reviews, indicating "generally favorable reviews".

Track listing

Charts

References

External links

2014 albums
Ghostly International albums
Tobacco (musician) albums